Psychogenic alopecia, also called over-grooming or psychological baldness, is a compulsive behavior that affects domestic cats. Generally, psychogenic alopecia does not lead to serious health consequences or a decreased lifespan.

Causes 
Grooming is a natural behavior for cats. Cats spend 5–25% of their waking hours grooming. Grooming becomes excessive when it takes precedence over other activities or no longer seems functional. Excessive grooming, which can lead to hair loss, skin wounds, and ulceration, can result from chronic stress or develop in cats who already exhibit nervous temperaments. Even when the source of stress is resolved or removed, excessive grooming may continue. There may be some genetic basis for the behavior, and it predominantly affects purebred cats of oriental breeds, but can develop in any feline. Female cats appear more susceptible. Environmental factors suspected of causing over-grooming include flea allergy, boredom, food allergy, dust or pollen causing an allergic reaction, constipation and urinary tract infection caused by avoidance of a dirty litter tray, dermatitis, and anxiety caused by inconsistent meal times. Deprivation of sunlight could be the part of the problem for indoors only cats.

Symptoms 
Areas affected are those the cat can access most easily, including the abdomen, legs, flank, and chest.

 Baldness, usually beginning with the abdomen.
 Obvious over-grooming (although some cats may only engage in the behavior in the absence of owners).
 Redness, rashes, pus, scabs on the bald area or areas traumatized by over-grooming.
 A highly irritable cat may even cut its face with the claw of its hind foot if over-zealously scratching the back of its head.

Treatment

The cat should be taken to a veterinarian. The most suspected cause of skin problems in cats will be fleas. Other causes of over-grooming are not as easily ascertained. As household antiseptics are known to be toxic to cats, veterinary antiseptics for cats can be used to treat open sores, if they do occur. Sores can also be treated with cream, oral or injected anti-inflammatories, however if the problem continues to recur it may be more cost effective to subject the cat to laboratory testing early on. It may be difficult to keep a clean dressing on a cat's belly, and an anti-lick collar is adequate to let the wound heal. If an anti-lick collar is used, a soft anti-lick collar is less cumbersome, although they are less durable. If the cat wears a plastic anti-lick collar, it may use the edge of the collar to grind against existing wounds, making them worse. A soft anti-lick collar will become less effective as it is kicked out of the shape by the cat's hind leg, and will need prompt replacement. The cat can sanitize the wound if the collar is removed for daily short periods of time, also giving the cat an opportunity for an overall grooming. Scratches and wounds can heal completely using this method. When the cat stops wearing the collar, thinned hair, redness of skin or cracked nipples on the cat are early indicators that the cat has started to over-groom again. 

Antidepressants for cats may be suggested by a vet.

See also 
 Cat flea
 Cat health
 Cat skin disorders
 Feather-plucking
 Trichotillomania: a compulsive hair-pulling behavior in humans that can cause hair loss

References 

Cat diseases